The 1999 McDonald's Championship took place at the Fila Forum in Assago, near Milan, Italy. It was the final tournament.

Participants

Bracket

Final standings

Sources
Spurs rally
Wilt will be remembered
1999 edition 
Part 3

External links
NBA International Pre-Season and Regular-Season Games
List of champions at a-d-c

1999–2000
1999–2000 in American basketball
1999–2000 in Lithuanian basketball
1999–2000 in Australian basketball
1999–2000 in Brazilian basketball
1999–2000 in Italian basketball
1999 in Lebanese sport
International basketball competitions hosted by Italy